Qaraçı (also, Karachay and Karachy) is a village and municipality in the Khachmaz Rayon of Azerbaijan.  It has a population of 785.  The municipality consists of the villages of Qaraçı, Qaraqaşlı, Laman, and Çaxmaqlı.

References 

Populated places in Khachmaz District